Liam Gerard Simpson (born 21 June 1966) is an Irish former hurler. At club level he played with Bennettsbridge and was also a member of the Kilkenny senior hurling team. He usually lined out as a corner-back.

Career

Simpson first came to prominence at juvenile and underage levels with the Bennettsbridge club, however, his early sporting life was dominated by soccer. As a centre half of sweeper with his local club East End, he won every honour in the Kilkenny and District League. At imter-county level, Simpson was overlooked for the Kilkenny minor and under-21 teams, however, he won an All-Ireland Junior Championship title in 1990. This success saw him drafted on to the Kilkenny senior hurling team in advance of the 1990-91 league. Simspon was corner-back on the Kilkenny team that won consecutive All-Ireland CHampionship titles in 1992 and 1993. His other honours include a National League title, three consecutive Leinster Championship medals and two consecutive All-Star Awards.

Honours

Team

Kilkenny
All-Ireland Senior Hurling Championship: 1992, 1993
Leinster Senior Hurling Championship: 1991, 1992, 1993
National Hurling League: 1994-95
All-Ireland Junior Hurling Championship: 1990
Leinster Junior Hurling Championship: 1990

Individual

Awards
All-Star Award: 1992, 1993

References

1966 births
Living people
Bennettsbridge hurlers
Kilkenny inter-county hurlers
All-Ireland Senior Hurling Championship winners